The 1958 All-Pacific Coast football team consists of American football players chosen by various organizations for All-Pacific Coast teams for the 1958 NCAA University Division football season.

Selections

Quarterbacks
 Joe Kapp, California (AP-1; Coaches-1)
 Bobby Newman, Washington State (Coaches-2)
 John Hangartner, Arizona State (AP-2)

Halfbacks
 Jack Hart, California (AP-1; Coaches-1)
 Willie West, Oregon (AP-2; Coaches-1)
 Don Buford, USC (Coaches-2)
 Ray Smith, UCLA (Coaches-2)

Fullbacks
 Charles "Chuck" Morrell, Washington State (AP-1; Coaches-1)
 Nub Beamer, Oregon State (AP-2; Coaches-2)
 Sam Dawson, San Jose State (AP-2)

Ends
 Chris Burford, Stanford (AP-1; Coaches-1)
 Marlin McKeever, USC (AP-1; Coaches-1)
 Dick Bass, College of the Pacific (AP-1)
 Jim Steffen, UCLA (AP-2; Coaches-2)
 Bill Steiger, Washington State (AP-2; Coaches-2)

Tackles
 Ted Bates, Oregon State (AP-1; Coaches-1)
 Bill Leeke, UCLA (Coaches-1)
 Dan Ficca, USC (AP-1; Coaches-2)
 Troy Barbee, Stanford (Coaches-2 [tie])
 Jim Linden, Oregon (Coaches-2 [tie])
 Kurt Gegner, Washington (AP-2)
 Pete Johnson, Idaho (AP-2)

Guards
 Jim Brackins, Oregon State (AP-1; Coaches-1)
 Bob Grottkau, Oregon (AP-1; Coaches-1 [tie])
 Frank Florentino, USC (Coaches-1 [tie])
 Pete Domoto, California (AP-2; Coaches-2)
 Don Armstrong, Washington (Coaches-2)
 Sonny Sanchez, Oregon State (AP-2)

Centers
 Bob Peterson, Oregon (AP-2; Coaches-1)
 Terry Jones, California (Coaches-2 [tie])
 Marv Nelson, Washington State (AP-1; Coaches-2 [tie])

Key

AP = Associated Press, selections made by the AP with assistance from boards of newspapermen and broadcasters along the coast

Coaches = selected by the conference coaches

Bold = Consensus first-team selection of both the AP and conference coaches

See also
1958 College Football All-America Team

References

All-Pacific Coast Football Team
All-Pacific Coast football teams
All-Pac-12 Conference football teams